Sloboda is the name of several rural localities in Russia.

Modern localities

Arkhangelsk Oblast
As of 2012, two rural localities in Arkhangelsk Oblast bear this name:
Sloboda, Vilegodsky District, Arkhangelsk Oblast, a selo in Pavlovsky Selsoviet of Vilegodsky District
Sloboda, Vinogradovsky District, Arkhangelsk Oblast, a village in Osinovsky Selsoviet of Vinogradovsky District

Bryansk Oblast
As of 2012, four rural localities in Bryansk Oblast bear this name:
Sloboda, Karachevsky District, Bryansk Oblast, a village under the administrative jurisdiction of Karachev Urban Administrative Okrug in Karachevsky District; 
Sloboda, Mglinsky District, Bryansk Oblast, a village in Molodkovsky Rural Administrative Okrug of Mglinsky District; 
Sloboda, Rognedinsky District, Bryansk Oblast, a village in Fedorovsky Rural Administrative Okrug of Rognedinsky District; 
Sloboda, Trubchevsky District, Bryansk Oblast, a village in Usokhsky Rural Administrative Okrug of Trubchevsky District;

Republic of Buryatia
As of 2012, one rural locality in the Republic of Buryatia bears this name:
Sloboda, Republic of Buryatia, a selo in Poselsky Selsoviet of Bichursky District

Ivanovo Oblast
As of 2012, one rural locality in Ivanovo Oblast bears this name:
Sloboda, Ivanovo Oblast, a village in Verkhnelandekhovsky District

Kaluga Oblast
As of 2012, seven rural localities in Kaluga Oblast bear this name:
Sloboda, Babyninsky District, Kaluga Oblast, a village in Babyninsky District
Sloboda (Barsuki Rural Settlement), Dzerzhinsky District, Kaluga Oblast, a village in Dzerzhinsky District; municipally, a part of Barsuki Rural Settlement of that district
Sloboda (Ugorskaya Rural Settlement), Dzerzhinsky District, Kaluga Oblast, a village in Dzerzhinsky District; municipally, a part of Ugorskaya Rural Settlement of that district
Sloboda, Khvastovichsky District, Kaluga Oblast, a selo in Khvastovichsky District
Sloboda, Kozelsky District, Kaluga Oblast, a village in Kozelsky District
Sloboda, Medynsky District, Kaluga Oblast, a village in Medynsky District
Sloboda, Sukhinichsky District, Kaluga Oblast, a village in Sukhinichsky District

Kirov Oblast
As of 2012, three rural localities in Kirov Oblast bear this name:
Sloboda, Afanasyevsky District, Kirov Oblast, a village in Ichetovkinsky Rural Okrug of Afanasyevsky District; 
Sloboda, Kotelnichsky District, Kirov Oblast, a village in Spassky Rural Okrug of Kotelnichsky District; 
Sloboda, Nagorsky District, Kirov Oblast, a village in Nagorsky Rural Okrug of Nagorsky District;

Komi Republic
As of 2012, one rural locality in the Komi Republic bears this name:
Sloboda, Komi Republic, a village in Kuratovo Selo Administrative Territory of Sysolsky District;

Kostroma Oblast
As of 2012, two rural localities in Kostroma Oblast bear this name:
Sloboda, Antropovsky District, Kostroma Oblast, a village in Kotelnikovskoye Settlement of Antropovsky District; 
Sloboda, Kostromskoy District, Kostroma Oblast, a village in Kuzmishchenskoye Settlement of Kostromskoy District;

Kursk Oblast
As of 2012, one rural locality in Kursk Oblast bears this name:
Sloboda, Kursk Oblast, a village in Troitskokrasnyansky Selsoviet of Shchigrovsky District

Lipetsk Oblast
As of 2012, one rural locality in Lipetsk Oblast bears this name:
Sloboda, Lipetsk Oblast, a selo in Slobodskoy Selsoviet of Izmalkovsky District;

Moscow Oblast
As of 2012, four rural localities in Moscow Oblast bear this name:
Sloboda, Klinsky District, Moscow Oblast, a village in Voroninskoye Rural Settlement of Klinsky District; 
Sloboda, Leninsky District, Moscow Oblast, a village in Razvilkovskoye Rural Settlement of Leninsky District; 
Sloboda, Ruzsky District, Moscow Oblast, a village in Volkovskoye Rural Settlement of Ruzsky District; 
Sloboda, Shatursky District, Moscow Oblast, a village under the administrative jurisdiction of the Town of Shatura in Shatursky District;

Novgorod Oblast
As of 2012, three rural localities in Novgorod Oblast bear this name:
Sloboda, Chudovsky District, Novgorod Oblast, a village in Uspenskoye Settlement of Chudovsky District
Sloboda, Lyubytinsky District, Novgorod Oblast, a village under the administrative jurisdiction of Lyubytinskoye Settlement in Lyubytinsky District
Sloboda, Parfinsky District, Novgorod Oblast, a village in Fedorkovskoye Settlement of Parfinsky District

Omsk Oblast
As of 2012, one rural locality in Omsk Oblast bears this name:
Sloboda, Omsk Oblast, a village in Zavyalovsky Rural Okrug of Znamensky District;

Oryol Oblast
As of 2012, three rural localities in Oryol Oblast bear this name:
Sloboda, Mtsensky District, Oryol Oblast, a village in Bashkatovsky Selsoviet of Mtsensky District; 
Sloboda, Sverdlovsky District, Oryol Oblast, a village in Koshelevsky Selsoviet of Sverdlovsky District; 
Sloboda, Zalegoshchensky District, Oryol Oblast, a village in Nizhne-Zalegoshchensky Selsoviet of Zalegoshchensky District;

Perm Krai
As of 2012, one rural locality in Perm Krai bears this name:
Sloboda, Perm Krai, a village in Cherdynsky District

Pskov Oblast
As of 2012, five rural localities in Pskov Oblast bear this name:
Sloboda, Bezhanitsky District, Pskov Oblast, a village in Bezhanitsky District
Sloboda, Gdovsky District, Pskov Oblast, a village in Gdovsky District
Sloboda, Porkhovsky District, Pskov Oblast, two villages in Porkhovsky District
Sloboda, Pskovsky District, Pskov Oblast, a village in Pskovsky District

Ryazan Oblast
As of 2012, two rural localities in Ryazan Oblast bear this name:
Sloboda, Rybnovsky District, Ryazan Oblast, a village in Markovsky Rural Okrug of Rybnovsky District
Sloboda, Shilovsky District, Ryazan Oblast, a village in Muratovsky Rural Okrug of Shilovsky District

Smolensk Oblast
As of 2012, twenty rural localities in Smolensk Oblast bear this name:
Sloboda, Demidovsky District, Smolensk Oblast, a village in Dubrovskoye Rural Settlement of Demidovsky District
Sloboda, Gagarinsky District, Smolensk Oblast, a village in Pokrovskoye Rural Settlement of Gagarinsky District
Sloboda, Cherepovskoye Rural Settlement, Khislavichsky District, Smolensk Oblast, a village in Cherepovskoye Rural Settlement of Khislavichsky District
Sloboda, Upinskoye Rural Settlement, Khislavichsky District, Smolensk Oblast, a village in Upinskoye Rural Settlement of Khislavichsky District
Sloboda, Krasninsky District, Smolensk Oblast, a village in Oktyabrskoye Rural Settlement of Krasninsky District
Sloboda, Alexandrovskoye Rural Settlement, Monastyrshchinsky District, Smolensk Oblast, a village in Alexandrovskoye Rural Settlement of Monastyrshchinsky District
Sloboda, Dobroselskoye Rural Settlement, Monastyrshchinsky District, Smolensk Oblast, a village in Dobroselskoye Rural Settlement of Monastyrshchinsky District
Sloboda, Slobodskoye Rural Settlement, Monastyrshchinsky District, Smolensk Oblast, a village in Slobodskoye Rural Settlement of Monastyrshchinsky District
Sloboda, Tatarskoye Rural Settlement, Monastyrshchinsky District, Smolensk Oblast, a village in Tatarskoye Rural Settlement of Monastyrshchinsky District
Sloboda, Tatarskoye Rural Settlement, Monastyrshchinsky District, Smolensk Oblast, a village in Tatarskoye Rural Settlement of Monastyrshchinsky District
Sloboda, Pochinkovsky District, Smolensk Oblast, a village in Dankovskoye Rural Settlement of Pochinkovsky District
Sloboda, Roslavlsky District, Smolensk Oblast, a village in Astapkovichskoye Rural Settlement of Roslavlsky District
Sloboda, Kazimirovskoye Rural Settlement, Rudnyansky District, Smolensk Oblast, a village in Kazimirovskoye Rural Settlement of Rudnyansky District
Sloboda, Ponizovskoye Rural Settlement, Rudnyansky District, Smolensk Oblast, a village in Ponizovskoye Rural Settlement of Rudnyansky District
Sloboda, Smoligovskoye Rural Settlement, Rudnyansky District, Smolensk Oblast, a village in Smoligovskoye Rural Settlement of Rudnyansky District
Sloboda, Shumyachsky District, Smolensk Oblast, a village in Pervomayskoye Rural Settlement of Shumyachsky District
Sloboda, Divasovskoye Rural Settlement, Smolensky District, Smolensk Oblast, a village in Divasovskoye Rural Settlement of Smolensky District
Sloboda, Loinskoye Rural Settlement, Smolensky District, Smolensk Oblast, a village in Loinskoye Rural Settlement of Smolensky District
Sloboda, Pionerskoye Rural Settlement, Smolensky District, Smolensk Oblast, a village in Pionerskoye Rural Settlement of Smolensky District
Sloboda, Vyazemsky District, Smolensk Oblast, a village in Kaydakovskoye Rural Settlement of Vyazemsky District

Sverdlovsk Oblast
As of 2012, one rural locality in Sverdlovsk Oblast bears this name:
Sloboda, Sverdlovsk Oblast, a selo under the administrative jurisdiction of the City of Pervouralsk

Tula Oblast
As of 2012, three rural localities in Tula Oblast bear this name:
Sloboda, Slobodskoy Rural Okrug, Belyovsky District, Tula Oblast, a village in Slobodskoy Rural Okrug of Belyovsky District
Sloboda, Taratukhinsky Rural Okrug, Belyovsky District, Tula Oblast, a village in Taratukhinsky Rural Okrug of Belyovsky District
Sloboda, Dubensky District, Tula Oblast, a village in Voskresensky Rural Okrug of Dubensky District

Tver Oblast
As of 2012, seven rural localities in Tver Oblast bear this name:
Sloboda, Kalininsky District, Tver Oblast, a village in Mednovskoye Rural Settlement of Kalininsky District
Sloboda, Kashinsky District, Tver Oblast, a village in Shepelevskoye Rural Settlement of Kashinsky District
Sloboda, Konakovsky District, Tver Oblast, a village in Staromelkovskoye Rural Settlement of Konakovsky District
Sloboda, Krasnokholmsky District, Tver Oblast, a village in Barbinskoye Rural Settlement of Krasnokholmsky District
Sloboda, Molokovsky District, Tver Oblast, a village in Molokovskoye Rural Settlement of Molokovsky District
Sloboda, Ostashkovsky District, Tver Oblast, a village in Botovskoye Rural Settlement of Ostashkovsky District
Sloboda, Staritsky District, Tver Oblast, a village in Staritsa Rural Settlement of Staritsky District

Vladimir Oblast
As of 2012, one rural locality in Vladimir Oblast bears this name:
Sloboda, Vladimir Oblast, a village in Kolchuginsky District

Vologda Oblast
As of 2012, twelve rural localities in Vologda Oblast bear this name:
Sloboda, Afanasovsky Selsoviet, Babayevsky District, Vologda Oblast, a village in Afanasovsky Selsoviet of Babayevsky District
Sloboda, Kuysky Selsoviet, Babayevsky District, Vologda Oblast, a village in Kuysky Selsoviet of Babayevsky District
Sloboda, Belozersky District, Vologda Oblast, a village in Sholsky Selsoviet of Belozersky District
Sloboda, Anokhinsky Selsoviet, Gryazovetsky District, Vologda Oblast, a village in Anokhinsky Selsoviet of Gryazovetsky District
Sloboda, Pertsevsky Selsoviet, Gryazovetsky District, Vologda Oblast, a village in Pertsevsky Selsoviet of Gryazovetsky District
Sloboda, Kaduysky District, Vologda Oblast, a village in Nikolsky Selsoviet of Kaduysky District
Sloboda, Kichmengsko-Gorodetsky District, Vologda Oblast, a village in Pyzhugsky Selsoviet of Kichmengsko-Gorodetsky District
Sloboda, Nyuksensky District, Vologda Oblast, a village in Gorodishchensky Selsoviet of Nyuksensky District
Sloboda, Sokolsky District, Vologda Oblast, a village in Prigorodny Selsoviet of Sokolsky District
Sloboda, Totemsky District, Vologda Oblast, a village in Manylovsky Selsoviet of Totemsky District
Sloboda, Verkhovazhsky District, Vologda Oblast, a village in Lipetsky Selsoviet of Verkhovazhsky District
Sloboda, Vologodsky District, Vologda Oblast, a village in Nesvoysky Selsoviet of Vologodsky District

Voronezh Oblast
As of 2012, one rural locality in Voronezh Oblast bears this name:
Sloboda, Voronezh Oblast, a selo in Slobodskoye Rural Settlement of Bobrovsky District

Yaroslavl Oblast
As of 2012, seven rural localities in Yaroslavl Oblast bear this name:
Sloboda, Danilovsky District, Yaroslavl Oblast, a village in Slobodskoy Rural Okrug of Danilovsky District
Sloboda, Gavrilov-Yamsky District, Yaroslavl Oblast, a village in Mitinsky Rural Okrug of Gavrilov-Yamsky District
Sloboda, Lyubimsky District, Yaroslavl Oblast, a village in Pigalevsky Rural Okrug of Lyubimsky District
Sloboda, Pervomaysky District, Yaroslavl Oblast, a village in Prechistensky Rural Okrug of Pervomaysky District
Sloboda, Poshekhonsky District, Yaroslavl Oblast, a village in Priukhrinsky Rural Okrug of Poshekhonsky District
Sloboda, Ilyinsky Rural Okrug, Uglichsky District, Yaroslavl Oblast, a village in Ilyinsky Rural Okrug of Uglichsky District
Sloboda, Slobodskoy Rural Okrug, Uglichsky District, Yaroslavl Oblast, a village in Slobodskoy Rural Okrug of Uglichsky District

Renamed localities
Sloboda,  name of Povorskaya Sloboda, a village in Pokrovskoye Rural Settlement of Gagarinsky District in Smolensk Oblast, before February 2009
Sloboda, name of Przhevalskoye, a selo in Slobodskoy and Demidovsky Districts of Smolensk Oblast, before 1964.

Alternative names
Sloboda, alternative name of Sloboda-Seletskaya, a village under the administrative jurisdiction of Unecha Urban Administrative Okrug in Unechsky District of Bryansk Oblast; 
Sloboda, alternative name of Novaya Sloboda, a selo in Novoslobodsky Selsoviet of Bolsheboldinsky District in Nizhny Novgorod Oblast; 
Sloboda, alternative name of Slobodka, a village in Dubrovsky Selsoviet of Dolzhansky District in Oryol Oblast; 
Sloboda, alternative name of Slobodka, a village in Pennovsky Selsoviet of Trosnyansky District in Oryol Oblast;